Vello Lõugas (6 April 1937 Suure-Jaani – 21 May 1998 Tallinn) was an Estonian archaeologist.

In 1961 he graduated from Tartu State University.

In 1987 he was one of the founders of Estonian Heritage Society. Since 1995 he was the chief editor of the journal Austrvegr.

His main fields of research were burial mounds and forthills.

Awards
 1985: Estonian SSR State Prize

Works

 Leedu-eesti sõnaraamat. 1969
 Vestlusi eesti ja leedu keeles. 1971
 Toivo Kohv, R. Kärner, Vello Lõugas. Pirita jõgi. 1982
 Vello Lõugas, Jüri Selirand. Arheoloogiga Eestimaa teedel. 1977, 2nd edition 1989
 The archaeology of terror. 1991
 Kaali kraatriväljal Phaethonit otsimas. 1996

References

1937 births
1998 deaths
Estonian archaeologists
University of Tartu alumni
People from Suure-Jaani